The marketing for the 2008 Wii video game Wario Land: Shake It! featured multiple campaigns, the most notable being a YouTube video in which the protagonist Wario does various large-impact actions and collecting items, causing the surrounding YouTube webpage to be destroyed bit by bit while these items accumulate around the page. The video was directed by staff from the marketing company Goodby, Silverstein & Partners and produced by Jennifer Wilson of the production company Mike Kellogg. It was eventually taken down and replaced by a documentary-style advertisement for the 2009 Wii game Punch-Out!!, created by the same company.

The video advertisement was successful among YouTube users, journalists, and marketing professionals, while earning 4 million views on YouTube in its first month. The advertisement received multiple awards and recognition, particularly for having inspired future advertisements by other companies. Its removal was regarded as disappointing by GameZone staff due to only being able to see it now in non-interactive re-uploads.

Video
The YouTube ad features gameplay of the video game Wario Land: Shake It! showing Wario going through various parts of the game. As various impacts occur in the video, the surrounding elements (such as recommended videos, video descriptions, and YouTube functions) begin to degrade and fall apart. Coins and other objects also come out of the video frame and spread across the webpage. The video ends with the game's logo crashing on top of the YouTube video, causing it to fall into a pile of page elements. Viewers could pick up elements that fell around the page with their cursor, dragging and dropping them.

History
The trailer was released in 2008, and was an "interactive first" for YouTube. Its creative directors were Jeff Goodby and Rich Silverstein of marketing company Goodby, Silverstein & Partners. Its art direction was handled by Bryan Houlette, whose assistant art director was Erik Enberg. It was produced by the production company Mike Kellogg, and its producer was Jennifer Wilson. The video was created for YouTube in part because of the perception that YouTube was where kids may go to look into video games. The destruction of the surrounding page was done with this game because it reflected Wario's destructive nature. YouTube was initially skeptical about an ad that destroyed their website. YouTube changed its mind eventually due to its apparent creative and marketing merit. The ad was removed from YouTube upon the release of a documentary-style YouTube ad for Punch-Out!! for the Wii, created by the same marketing team behind the Shake It! ad.

The campaign was created to appeal to teenagers and had a budget of $80,000. Nintendo also held a competition at Six Flags near Los Angeles and St. Louis, where competitors competed for a "bottomless coin sack." Participants received fake Wario mustaches, and the winner won both the sack and an all-expense-paid trip to Nintendo World in New York. Another marketing campaign had Nintendo giving away gasoline at a Los Angeles Mobile Gas area to market Wario Land: Shake It!, in reference to Wario's flatulence.

Reception

The YouTube ad was well-received by journalists, YouTube users, and marketing professionals. The YouTube campaign was successful with this demographic, hitting 24 percent awareness with an initial goal of 12–15 percent. The ad received a lot of attention, accumulating 4 million views in its first month. It was the first ad of its kind, leading to similar ads in the following months. Despite this positive reception, the ad failed to push the sales of the game to hit the pre-goal number of 350,000 units by the end of 2008, which the campaign team attributed to the Great Recession and low game sales across the board. A YouTube representative told the team behind the ad that it caused them to receive a number of calls from advertisers questioning why this function was not known to them. Authors Damian Ryan and Calvin Jones discussed the YouTube ad as a case study in marketing, while praising it for its innovation. It was given a silver award in the 88th annual edition of "The Art Directors," while art director Robert Lindstrom gave praise to the YouTube ad for bringing attention to Wario Land: Shake It! in a unique way. Marketer and author Avinash Kaushik called it "creative" and stated that he loved the ad.

Kotaku writer Mike Fahey praised the YouTube ad's "genius" while comparing it favorably to Nintendo's gasoline giveaway campaign, which he found "stale." A GameZone writer expressed sadness that the only way that the YouTube ad would be seen is through non-interactive YouTube videos, calling it Nintendo's best advertisement ever. Destructoid writer Colette Burnett felt that it would be memorable for its viewers. Burnett, along with Wired writer Chris Kohler and Joystiq writer Ross Miller, found it to be a clever ad, with the latter praising it as a "fun surprise." CNET writer Josh Lowensohn praised it as "memorable" and "mind-blowingly cool," stating it will put a "smile on [viewers'] face[s]."

Notes

References

2008 YouTube videos
Advertisements
Video game marketing
Wario Land
Wario (series)
Wii